Antonio "Toni" Cancian (Mareno di Piave, 2 July 1951) is an Italian politician and entrepreneur from Veneto.

A long-time Christian Democrat active in local government, Cancian was elected to the Italian Chamber of Deputies in the 1992 general election. After 15 years out of active politics, he stood in the 2009 European Parliament election for The People of Freedom and was easily elected.

References

1951 births
Living people
People from the Province of Treviso
Christian Democracy (Italy) politicians
The People of Freedom politicians
New Centre-Right politicians
Deputies of Legislature XI of Italy
Politicians of Veneto
MEPs for Italy 2009–2014
The People of Freedom MEPs